Heckler & Koch GmbH (HK) is a German defense manufacturing company that manufactures handguns, rifles, submachine guns, and grenade launchers. The company is located in Oberndorf am Neckar in the German state of Baden-Württemberg, and also has subsidiaries in the United Kingdom, France and the United States.

The Heckler & Koch Group comprises Heckler & Koch GmbH, Heckler & Koch Defense, NSAF Ltd., and Heckler & Koch France SAS. The company's motto is "Keine Kompromisse!" (No Compromises!). HK provides firearms for many military and paramilitary units, including the SAS, KMar, the US Navy SEALs, Delta Force, HRT, Canada's Joint Task Force 2, the German KSK and GSG 9, and many other counter-terrorist and hostage rescue teams.

Their products include the MP5, UMP submachine guns, the G3, HK417 battle rifles, the HK33, G36, HK416 assault rifles, the MG5, HK21 General-purpose machine guns, the MP7 personal defense weapon, the USP series of handguns, and the PSG1 sniper rifle. All HK firearms are named by a prefix and the official designation, with suffixes used for variants.

HK has a history of innovation in firearms, such as the use of polymers in weapon designs and the use of an integral rail for flashlights on handguns. HK also developed modern polygonal rifling, noted for its high accuracy, increased muzzle velocity and barrel life. Not all its technologically ambitious designs have become commercially successful products (for instance, the advanced but now abandoned G11 military rifle, which fired caseless high-velocity ammunition). In its extensive product range, HK has used the following operating systems for small arms: blowback operation, short-recoil, roller-delayed blowback, gas-delayed blowback, and gas operation (via Short-stroke piston).

History
With the fall of Germany at the end of World War II, Oberndorf came under French control, and the entire Waffenfabrik Mauser AG factory was dismantled by French occupying forces. All factory records were destroyed on orders of the local French Army commander. In 1948, three former Mauser engineers, Edmund Heckler, Theodor Koch, and Alex Seidel, saved what they could from the factory and used what they salvaged to start a machine tool plant in the vacant factory that became known as the Engineering Office Heckler & Co.

On December 28, 1949, the Engineering Office Heckler & Co. changed its name and was registered officially as Heckler & Koch GmbH. Initially the new company manufactured machine tools, bicycle and sewing machine parts, gauges and other precision parts.

In 1956, Heckler & Koch responded to the West German government's tender for a new infantry rifle for the Bundeswehr (German Federal Army) with the proposal of the G3 battle rifle, which was based on the Spanish CETME rifle. The German government awarded Heckler & Koch the tender and by 1959 declared the G3 the standard rifle of the Bundeswehr. Later on in 1961, Heckler & Koch developed the 7.62×51mm  HK21 general-purpose machine gun, based on the G3 battle rifle.

In 1966, Heckler & Koch introduced the HK54 machine pistol, which eventually launched in 1969 as the MP5 submachine gun. Two years later, the company introduced the 5.56×45mm HK33 assault rifle, a smaller version of the G3 battle rifle chambered in 5.56mm NATO.

Diversification
In 1974, Heckler & Koch diversified into two more areas, HK Defense and Law Enforcement Technology and HK Hunting and Sports Firearms. Since then HK has designed and manufactured more than 100 different types of firearms and devices for the world's military and law enforcement organizations as well as sports shooters and hunters.

In 1990, Heckler & Koch completed two decades of development of their revolutionary caseless weapon system and produced prototypes of the Heckler & Koch G11. The company also produced prototypes of the Heckler & Koch G41 intended for the Bundeswehr. Due to the international political climate at the time (East and West Germany uniting and defense budget cuts) the company was unable to secure funded contracts from the German government to support production of either weapon system and became financially vulnerable. The next year, Heckler & 
Koch was sold to British Aerospace's Royal Ordnance division.

During 1994 and 1995, the German government awarded Heckler & Koch contracts for producing an updated standard assault rifle and updated standard sidearm for the Bundeswehr. Heckler & Koch developed and produced the Project HK50, a lightweight carbon fiber assault rifle, which became the HK G36 assault rifle. In addition, Heckler & Koch produced the Heckler & Koch USP derived as a variant of its Universale Selbstladepistole (USP) series of handguns (which had been in production since 1989). The P8 was adopted as the standard handgun for the Bundeswehr in 1994 and the G36 in 1995.

As the result of a 1999 merger between British Aerospace and Marconi Electronic Systems, Heckler & Koch was owned by the resulting BAE Systems; it was contracted to refurbish the British Army's SA80 rifles (which had been built by Royal Ordnance) This contract entailed a modification programme to the SA80 series of rifles to address a number of reliability issues with the SA80. In 2002, BAE Systems restructured and sold Heckler & Koch to a group of private investors, who created the German group holding company HK Beteiligungs GmbH.

In 2003, HK Beteiligungs GmbH's business organization restructured as Heckler & Koch Jagd und Sportwaffen GmbH (HKJS) and its business was separated into the two business areas similar to the 1974 business mission areas, Defense and Law Enforcement and Sporting Firearms.

In 2004, Heckler & Koch was awarded a major handgun contract for the U.S. Department of Homeland Security, worth a potential $26.2 million for up to 65,000 handguns. This contract ranks as the single largest handgun procurement contract in US law enforcement history.

HK was contracted by the United States Army to produce the kinetic energy subsystem (see: kinetic projectiles or kinetic energy penetrator) of the Objective Individual Combat Weapon, a planned replacement for the M16/M203 grenade launcher combination. The OICW was designed to fire 5.56 mm bullets and 25 mm grenades. The kinetic energy component was also developed separately as the XM8, though both the OICW and XM8 are now indefinitely suspended.

Heckler & Koch developed an AR-15/M4 carbine variant, marketed as the HK416. HK replaced the direct impingement system used by the Stoner design on the original M16 with a short-stroke piston operating system. The civilian models are named the MR223 and, in the US, the MR556A1.

There is no indication that the rifle will be adopted by the United States Armed Forces other than in the Marine Corps as the IAR or M27, but the elite Delta Force and other United States special operations units have fielded the HK416 in combat, and Oklahoma Senator Tom Coburn has called for "free and open competition" to determine whether the army should buy the HK416 or continue to purchase more M4 carbines. Incoming United States Secretary of the Army Pete Geren agreed in July 2007 to hold a "dust chamber" test pitting the M4 against the Heckler & Koch HK416 and XM8, as well as the rival FN SCAR design. Coburn had threatened to stop Geren's Senate confirmation if he did not agree to the test. The Heckler & Koch XM8 and FN SCAR had the fewest failures in the test, closely followed by the HK416, while the M4 had by far the most. In 2007, the Norwegian Army became the first to field the HK416 as a standard-issue rifle.

HK sells its pistols in the United States to both law enforcement and civilian markets. The company has locations in Virginia, New Hampshire, and Georgia.

Trafficking
H&K has been accused of shipping small arms to conflict regions such as Bosnia and Nepal, and has licensed its weapons for production by governments with poor human rights records such as Sudan, Thailand and Myanmar. It has been argued that the company effectively evaded EU export restrictions when these licensees sold HK weapons to conflict zones including Indonesia, Sri Lanka and Sierra Leone.

According to the newspaper Stuttgarter Nachrichten (31 August 2011), as well as the state broadcaster ARD, a large stockpile of G36 assault rifles fell into rebel hands during the August 2011 attack on Muammar Gaddafi's compound in Tripoli. It is unclear how many were exported to Libya and by whom.

Illegal arms sales to Mexico 
On December 11, 2011, federal, state and local Mexican police officers used battle rifles to fire on Ayotzinapa Rural Teachers' College students and peasant organizations to disperse a blockade on Mexican Federal Highway 95D, resulting in the deaths of students Jorge Alexis Herrera and Gabriel Echeverría de Jesús. According to media reports, 7.62×51mm NATO round cases were found at the crime scene which were of the same caliber as rounds spent by H&K G3 rifles.

In Iguala and Cocula, corrupt police officers and cartelmen are known to have used H&K G36 rifles during the 2014 Iguala mass kidnapping on September 26–27, 2013. At least six teaching students were murdered by cartelmen and corrupt local police, and 43 others are missing and presumed dead. Other than the six identified persons, no other bodies have been found, and they are believed to have been incinerated.

As a result of efforts by civil society and human rights organizations in Mexico and Germany, H&K and two of its former employees were brought before the Provincial Court of Stuttgart. After ten months of trial, on February 21, 2019, the court convicted them of illegally selling arms to Mexican governmental institutions which failed to acknowledge their due observance of human rights. The two former employees (sales manager Sahlmann and administrative employee Beuter) had been found to have used fraudulent permits in the sale of 4,700 rifles and large quantities of ammunition. H&K was issued a fine of 3.7 million euros, and the two men received suspended sentences of 17 and 22 months. The spokesman of the Presidency of the Republic of Mexico, Jesús Ramírez Cuevas, said that the amount of the fine should go to the victims and their families. 

On March 30, 2021, Germany's Federal Court of Justice (BGH) upheld the lower court's decision, finding that H&K employees knowingly falsified information on the nature and destination of arms sold by the company in order to attain federal export licenses.

Werknummern designations 
The Werknummern system dates back to the first HK rifles. It uses two or three digits, and as such is also referred to as the "HK 3-digit system" Exceptions like the Heckler & Koch HK416 exist, but those are almost always for marketing reasons, and do actually have in-house designations that fit the system. For example, the HK416 (originally marketed as the HK M4 and HK M16) was intended to replace the M4 and M16, and so, the different models were amalgamated into simply the HK416, but internally was the HK333. The M320 Grenade Launcher Module is a designation assigned by the US military, the HK product name is the HK 269 and 279.

 First digit: generation
 No digit = First generation
 1 = Second generation
 2 = Third generation
 3 = Fourth generation
 4 = Fifth generation

Second digit: form factor 
 1 = Magazine fed machine gun
 2 = Belt fed machine gun
 3 = Full sized rifle
 4 = Semi-automatic military rifle
 5 = Select fire carbine
 6 = Shoulder fired standalone grenade launcher
 7 = Underbarrel mounted grenade launcher
 8 = Hunting and repeating weapons for civilian market

Third digit: caliber
 1 - 7.62×51mm NATO
 2 - 7.62×39mm
 3 - 5.56×45mm NATO
 4 - 9×19mm Parabellum/.40 S&W/.45 ACP
 5 - .50 BMG
 6 - HK 4.6×30mm
 7 - .300 AAC Blackout
 8 - 37mm Grenade
 9 - 40 mm grenade

Abbreviations
Format: Abbreviation = German Text ("English Text")
A =  ("version")
G =  ("rifle")
GMG =  Grenade Machine Gun
GMW =  (automatic grenade launcher)
MG =  (Machine Gun)
MP =  (Machine Pistol)
PSG =  ("precision sharp shooter rifle")
PSP =  ("police self-loading pistol")
SD =  ("sound dampener", "suppressor"); In the case of the MP5 having an integral suppressor, in the case of the USP, an extended threaded barrel for attaching a suppressor.
SG =  ("sharpshooters rifle")
SK =  ("sub compact")
SL =  ("Autoloader")
UMP = Universal Machine Pistol
UCP = Universal Combat Pistol
USC = Universal Self-loading Carbine
USP =  ("universal self-loading pistol")
VP =  ("people's pistol")
ZF = '' ("telescopic sight")

Date and country codes
H&K uses a letter combination to represent the year a pistol is manufactured.
A = 0
B = 1
C = 2
D = 3
E = 4
F = 5
G = 6
H = 7
I = 8
K = 9

The letter J is not used as a date marker. If an H&K pistol has the letter combination of BH it was manufactured in 2017 or CA in 2020.  The letter combination of DE represents manufacturing in the country of Germany. Pistols manufactured in Germany before 2008 and those produced at US facilities do not incorporate these letter combinations.

See also

List of Heckler & Koch products
List of modern armament manufacturers

References

External links

 Official website (international)
 Official website (United States)
 2008 Heckler & Koch Military and LE brochure
 HK information on Remtek

 
Companies based in Baden-Württemberg
Manufacturing companies established in 1949
Defence companies of Germany
Firearm manufacturers of Germany
 
German brands
Firearm manufacturers of the United States
Firearm importation companies of the United States